Hale Arena is a 5,000-seat multi-purpose arena in Kansas City, Missouri. It was built in 1992 and was home to the former Kansas City Knights basketball team after they moved from Kemper Arena in 2003. It was named in honor of H. D. "Joe" Hale and his wife Joyce for their financial contribution. Hale Arena is home of the American Royal rodeo.

Images

References

Sports venues in Missouri
American Basketball Association (2000–present) venues
Basketball venues in Missouri
Indoor arenas in Missouri
Sports in the Kansas City metropolitan area
Sports venues in Kansas City, Missouri
Sports venues completed in 1992
1992 establishments in Missouri
Rodeo venues in the United States